Opium in China may refer to:

 History of opium in China
 Opium Wars, the mid-1800s conflicts between Western powers and China including:
 the First Opium War (1839–1842)
 the Second Opium War (1856–1860)
 1967 Opium War, conflict between marooned elements of the Kuomintang (Chinese Nationalist Party) and the Kingdom of Laos
 Illegal drug trade in China#Opium

See also
Opium War (disambiguation)